Abell 478 is a galaxy cluster listed in the Abell catalogue.

See also
 Abell catalogue
 List of Abell clusters

References

478
Galaxy clusters
Abell richness class 2